Yitzchak Isaac of Zidichov (1805–June 4, 1873) was a noted Hasidic rabbi. He was the son of Rabbi Yisachar Barish, who was the brother of Rabbi Tzvi Hirsh of Zidichov (1763–1831). Rabbi Yitzchak Isaac was a close disciple of Rabbi Tzvi Hirsh of Zidichov until the latter's death. He later studied under Rabbi Shalom of Belz. He was the author of Likutei Maharya.

References

1805 births
1873 deaths
Hasidic rabbis in Europe
Rebbes of Zidichov
People from Zhydachiv